Beneath This Gruff Exterior is singer-songwriter John Hiatt's seventeenth album, released on May 6, 2003. It was his first album with New West Records, and it was also the only album on which backing band The Goners received front cover credit along with Hiatt (although The Goners had previously backed Hiatt on 1988's Slow Turning and 2001's The Tiki Bar Is Open).

Track listing
All tracks written by John Hiatt

"Uncommon Connection" – 4:11
"How Bad's The Coffee" – 3:56
"The Nagging Dark" – 3:15
"My Baby Blue" – 4:35
"My Dog And Me" – 3:15
"Almost Fed Up With The Blues" – 4:36
"Circle Back" – 4:30
"Window On The World" – 3:36
"Missing Pieces" – 4:06
"Fly Back Home" – 4:44
"The Last Time" – 4:53
"The Most Unoriginal Sin" – 4:15

Personnel
John Hiatt – guitar, vocals
and The Goners:
Sonny Landreth – electric guitar, slide guitar, Dobro, backing vocals
David Ranson – bass guitar
Kenneth Blevins – drums, backing vocals
with:
Bobby Keys – saxophone
Technical
Don Smith – production, nixing, engineering
Doug Sax – mastering
Kimberly Levitan – art direction, design
Michael "Mick" Wilson – photography

References

2003 albums
John Hiatt albums
New West Records albums